Lydia Thompson (born 10 February 1992) is a member of the England Women's Rugby Team having made her debut in 2012. At club level, she plays for Worcester Warriors Women.

International career 
Thompson made her debut for England in 2012, running in three tries against Spain during the 2012 European Cup. She played in the opening pool game of the 2014 Women's Rugby World Cup but was ruled out of the tournament due to injury, though the team went on to win.

She returned to international rugby in 2017, helping England to win the 2017 Six Nations Championship grand slam, and playing in every game of the 2017 Women's Rugby World Cup. That same year, she was nominated for World Rugby Player of the Year.

She moved to Rugby sevens in 2018 to play for England in the 2018 Commonwealth Games, and returned to 15s for the Quilter Internationals in November that year.

Though she missed the 2019 Six Nations championship, Thompson returned to play all England games of the 2019 Super Series, and scored the winning try of the country's Quilter International match against France.

In 2020, she again represented her country in its 2020 Six Nations match against Wales before the championship was cut short due to the COVID-19 pandemic. She was named in the England squad for the delayed 2021 Rugby World Cup held in New Zealand in October and November 2022.

Club career 
Thompson joined the Worcester Warriors Women (previously Worcester Valkyries) in 2010 and continues to play for the team.

Early life and education 
Thompson was born in 1992 in Stourbridge. She began playing rugby at eleven years old.

She went to Ounsdale High School in Wombourne before completing her schooling at King Edward VI College, Stourbridge. She studied at Derby University gaining a degree in Occupational Therapy in 2013 .   Thompson 
was awarded an Honorary Master of the University (HonMUniv) in July 2022 in recognition of her outstanding international rugby career Commendation .

Thompson worked as an occupational therapist for 2gether NHS Foundation Trust and applied to return to the NHS in April 2020 after the outbreak of COVID-19. Her husband, Tom, is also an occupational therapist.

References

External links
 
 

1992 births
Living people
Commonwealth Games bronze medallists for England
Commonwealth Games medallists in rugby sevens
England women's international rugby union players
English female rugby union players
Rugby sevens players at the 2018 Commonwealth Games
Rugby union players from Stourbridge
England international women's rugby sevens players
Occupational therapists
Medallists at the 2018 Commonwealth Games